Larry Melvin Webster III (born February 14, 1990) is a former American football defensive end. He was drafted by the Detroit Lions in the fourth round of the 2014 NFL Draft. He played college football at Bloomsburg. Webster is the son of former NFL defensive tackle Larry Webster Jr.

College career
On January 8, Webster was selected to the 2012 Don Hansen NCAA Division II All-Super Region One team following his Junior season. On January 13, he was selected to the All-PSAC Eastern Division first-team after the season. On January 17, 2013, Webster was selected as an honorable mention on the 2012 D2Football.com All-America Team. On January 30, 2013, he was selected to the 2012 Don Hansen NCAA Division II All-America Team.

On November 18, 2013, Webster was named the Beyond Sports Network Defensive Athlete of the Week for his performance. On December 5, 2013, he was selected to the All-Super Region One first-team by Daktronics. On December 12, 2013, he was finished as a finalist for the Cliff Harris Award. On January 19, 2014, Webster was selected to the All-PSAC first-team following his senior season. On January 21, 2014, he was selected to the Don Hansen Football Gazette NCAA Division II All-American third-team. On January 11, 2014, he was selected and participated in the 2014 East-West Shrine Game and was on the West team. Larry Webster III finished college at Bloomsburg playing four seasons in basketball, and only two seasons of football in which he recorded 88 tackles, 26 sacks, 3 forced fumbles and one interception.

Professional career

Detroit Lions
Webster was drafted by the Detroit Lions in the fourth round (136th overall) of the 2014 NFL Draft.

On September 5, 2015, the Lions waived him.

Carolina Panthers
The Carolina Panthers signed Webster to a futures contract on January 12, 2016. On September 3, 2016, he was waived by the Panthers as part of final roster cuts. The next day he was signed to the Panthers' practice squad. He was promoted to the active roster on October 1, 2016 but was released two days later and re-signed to the practice squad. He was promoted to the active roster on December 27, 2016.

On September 2, 2017, Webster was waived by the Panthers.

Tampa Bay Buccaneers
On October 10, 2017, Webster was signed to the Tampa Bay Buccaneers' practice squad. He was released on October 24, 2017.

Personal life
Webster is the son of Larry Webster Jr. and Melissa Webster. His father, Larry played in the NFL for 11 seasons for four teams. He grew up in Elkton, Maryland

References

External links
Bloomsburg bio
Detroit Lions bio

1990 births
Living people
American football defensive ends
Bloomsburg Huskies football players
Carolina Panthers players
Detroit Lions players
Players of American football from Maryland
Sportspeople from Hagerstown, Maryland
Tampa Bay Buccaneers players